The Morningside Mustangs program is a college football team that represents Morningside College in the Great Plains Athletic Conference, a part of the NAIA.  The team has had 23 head coaches since its first recorded football game in 1898. The current coach is Steve Ryan who first took the position for the 2002 season.  The program did not field a varsity team in 2001 as the school transitioned from the National Collegiate Athletic Association (NCAA) to the National Association of Intercollegiate Athletics (NAIA).

Key

Coaches

Notes

References

Lists of college football head coaches

Iowa sports-related lists